Heat transfer physics describes the kinetics of energy storage, transport, and energy transformation by principal energy carriers: phonons (lattice vibration waves), electrons, fluid particles, and photons. Heat is energy stored in temperature-dependent motion of particles including electrons, atomic nuclei, individual atoms, and molecules. Heat is transferred to and from matter by the principal energy carriers. The state of energy stored within matter, or transported by the carriers, is described by a combination of classical and quantum statistical mechanics. The energy is different made (converted) among various carriers.
The heat transfer processes (or kinetics) are governed by the rates at which various related physical phenomena occur, such as (for example) the rate of particle collisions in classical mechanics. These various states and kinetics determine the heat transfer, i.e., the net rate of energy storage or transport. Governing these process from the atomic level (atom or molecule length scale) to macroscale are the laws of thermodynamics, including conservation of energy.

Introduction 

Heat is thermal energy associated with temperature-dependent motion of particles. The macroscopic energy equation for infinitesimal volume used in heat transfer analysis is

So, the terms represent energy transport, storage and transformation. Heat flux vector  is composed of three macroscopic fundamental modes, which are conduction (: thermal conductivity), convection (: velocity), and radiation (: angular frequency, : polar angle, : spectral, directional radiation intensity, : unit vector), i.e., .

Once states and kinetics of the energy conversion and thermophysical properties are known, the fate of heat transfer is described by the above equation. These atomic-level mechanisms and kinetics are addressed in heat transfer physics. The microscopic thermal energy is stored, transported, and transformed by the principal energy carriers: phonons (p), electrons (e), fluid particles (f), and photons (ph).

Length and time scales 

Thermophysical properties of matter and the kinetics of interaction and energy exchange among the principal carriers are based on the atomic-level configuration and interaction. Transport properties such as thermal conductivity are calculated from these atomic-level properties using classical and quantum physics.  Quantum states of principal carriers (e.g.. momentum, energy) are derived from the Schrödinger equation (called first principle or ab initio) and the interaction rates (for kinetics) are calculated using the quantum states and the quantum perturbation theory (formulated as the Fermi golden rule).  Variety of ab initio (Latin for from the beginning) solvers (software) exist (e.g., ABINIT, CASTEP, Gaussian, Q-Chem, Quantum ESPRESSO, SIESTA, VASP, WIEN2k). Electrons in the inner shells (core) are not involved in heat transfer, and calculations are greatly reduced by proper approximations about the inner-shells electrons.

The quantum treatments, including equilibrium and nonequilibrium ab initio molecular dynamics (MD), involving larger lengths and times are limited by the computation resources, so various alternate treatments with simplifying assumptions have been used and kinetics.  In classical (Newtonian) MD, the motion of atom or molecule (particles) is based on the empirical or effective interaction potentials, which in turn can be based on curve-fit of ab initio calculations or curve-fit to thermophysical properties. From the ensembles of simulated particles, static or dynamics thermal properties or scattering rates are derived.

At yet larger length scales (mesoscale, involving many mean free paths), the Boltzmann transport equation (BTE) which is based on the classical Hamiltonian-statistical mechanics is applied. BTE considers particle states in terms of position and momentum vectors (x, p) and this is represented as the state occupation probability.  The occupation has equilibrium distributions (the known boson, fermion, and Maxwell–Boltzmann particles) and transport of energy (heat) is due to nonequilibrium (cause by a driving force or potential). Central to the transport is the role of scattering which turn the distribution toward equilibrium. The scattering is presented by the relations time or the mean free path.  The relaxation time (or its inverse which is the interaction rate) is found from other calculations (ab initio or MD) or empirically.  BTE can be numerically solved with Monte Carlo method, etc.

Depending on the length and time scale, the proper level of treatment (ab initio, MD, or BTE) is selected. Heat transfer physics analyses may involve multiple scales (e.g., BTE using interaction rate from ab initio or classical MD) with states and kinetic related to thermal energy storage, transport and transformation.

So, heat transfer physics covers the four principal energy carries and their kinetics from classical and quantum mechanical perspectives. This enables multiscale (ab initio, MD, BTE and macroscale) analyses, including low-dimensionality and size effects.

Phonon

Phonon (quantized lattice vibration wave) is a central thermal energy carrier contributing to heat capacity (sensible heat storage) and conductive heat transfer in condensed phase, and plays a very important role in thermal energy conversion. Its transport properties are represented by the phonon conductivity tensor Kp (W/m-K, from the Fourier law qk,p = -Kp⋅∇ T) for bulk materials, and the phonon boundary resistance ARp,b [K/(W/m2)] for solid interfaces, where A is the interface area. The phonon specific heat capacity cv,p (J/kg-K) includes the quantum effect.

For an equilibrium potential ⟨φ⟩o of a system with N atoms, the total potential ⟨φ⟩ is found by a Taylor series expansion at the equilibrium and this can be approximated by the second derivatives (the harmonic approximation) as

where di is the displacement vector of atom i, and Γ is the spring (or force) constant as the second-order derivatives of the potential. The equation of motion for the lattice vibration in terms of the displacement of atoms [d(jl,t): displacement vector of the j-th atom in the l-th unit cell at time t] is

where m is the atomic mass and Γ is the force constant tensor. The atomic displacement is the summation over the normal modes [sα: unit vector of mode α, ωp: angular frequency of wave, and κp: wave vector]. Using this plane-wave displacement, the equation of motion becomes the eigenvalue equation

where M is the diagonal mass matrix and D is the harmonic dynamical matrix. Solving this eigenvalue equation gives the relation between the angular frequency ωp and the wave vector κp, and this relation is called the phonon dispersion relation.  Thus, the phonon dispersion relation is determined by matrices M and D, which depend on the atomic structure and the strength of interaction among constituent atoms (the stronger the interaction and the lighter the atoms, the higher is the phonon frequency and the larger is the slope dωp/dκp).  The Hamiltonian of phonon system with the harmonic approximation is

where Dij is the dynamical matrix element between atoms i and j, and di (dj) is the displacement of i (j) atom, and p is momentum. From this and the solution to dispersion relation, the phonon annihilation operator for the quantum treatment is defined as

where N is the number of normal modes divided by α and ħ is the reduced Planck constant. The creation operator is the adjoint of the annihilation operator,

The Hamiltonian in terms of bκ,α† and bκ,α is Hp = Σκ,αħωp,α[bκ,α†bκ,α + 1/2] and bκ,α†bκ,α is the phonon number operator. The energy of quantum-harmonic oscillator is Ep = Σκ,α [fp(κ,α) + 1/2]ħωp,α(κp), and thus the quantum of phonon energy ħωp.

The phonon dispersion relation gives all possible phonon modes within the Brillouin zone (zone within the primitive cell in reciprocal space), and the phonon density of states Dp (the number density of possible phonon modes). The phonon group velocity up,g is the slope of the dispersion curve, dωp/dκp. Since phonon is a boson particle, its occupancy follows the Bose–Einstein distribution {fpo = [exp(ħωp/kBT)-1]−1, kB: Boltzmann constant}.  Using the phonon density of states and this occupancy distribution, the phonon energy is Ep(T) = ∫Dp(ωp)fp(ωp,T)ħωpdωp, and the phonon density is np(T) = ∫Dp(ωp)fp(ωp,T)dωp. Phonon heat capacity cv,p (in solid cv,p = cp,p, cv,p : constant-volume heat capacity, cp,p: constant-pressure heat capacity) is the temperature derivatives of phonon energy for the Debye model (linear dispersion model), is

where TD is the Debye temperature, m is atomic mass, and n is the atomic number density (number density of phonon modes for the crystal 3n). This gives the Debye T3 law at low temperature and Dulong-Petit law at high temperatures.

From the kinetic theory of gases, thermal conductivity of principal carrier i (p, e, f and ph) is

where ni is the carrier density and the heat capacity is per carrier, ui is the carrier speed and λi is the mean free path (distance traveled by carrier before an scattering event). Thus, the larger the carrier density, heat capacity and speed, and the less significant the scattering, the higher is the conductivity. For phonon λp represents the interaction (scattering) kinetics of phonons and is related to the scattering relaxation time τp or rate (= 1/τp) through λp= upτp. Phonons interact with other phonons, and with electrons, boundaries, impurities, etc., and λp combines these interaction mechanisms through the Matthiessen rule. At low temperatures, scattering by boundaries is dominant and with increase in temperature the interaction rate with impurities, electron and other phonons become important, and finally the phonon-phonon scattering dominants for T > 0.2TD. The interaction rates are reviewed in and includes quantum perturbation theory and MD.

A number of conductivity models are available with approximations regarding the dispersion and λp. Using the single-mode relaxation time approximation (∂fp′/∂t|s = −fp′/τp) and the gas kinetic theory, Callaway phonon (lattice) conductivity model as

With the Debye model (a single group velocity up,g, and a specific heat capacity calculated above), this becomes 

where a is the lattice constant a = n−1/3 for a cubic lattice, and n is the atomic number density. Slack phonon conductivity model mainly considering acoustic phonon scattering (three-phonon interaction) is given as

where  is the mean atomic weight of the atoms in the primitive cell, Va=1/n is the average volume per atom, TD,∞ is the high-temperature Debye temperature, T is the temperature, No is the number of atoms in the primitive cell, and ⟨γ2G⟩ is the mode-averaged square of the Grüneisen constant or parameter at high temperatures. This model is widely tested with pure nonmetallic crystals, and the overall agreement is good, even for complex crystals.

Based on the kinetics and atomic structure consideration, a material with high crystalline and strong interactions, composed of light atoms (such as diamond and graphene) is expected to have large phonon conductivity. Solids with more than one atom in the smallest unit cell representing the lattice have two types of phonons, i.e., acoustic and optical. (Acoustic phonons are in-phase movements of atoms about their equilibrium positions, while optical phonons are out-of-phase movement of adjacent atoms in the lattice.) Optical phonons have higher energies (frequencies), but make smaller contribution to conduction heat transfer, because of their smaller group velocity and occupancy.

Phonon transport across hetero-structure boundaries (represented with Rp,b, phonon boundary resistance) according to the boundary scattering approximations are modeled as acoustic and diffuse mismatch models. Larger phonon transmission (small Rp,b) occurs at boundaries where material pairs have similar phonon properties (up, Dp, etc.), and in contract large Rp,b occurs when some material is softer (lower cut-off phonon frequency) than the other.

Electron 

Quantum electron energy states for electron are found using the electron quantum Hamiltonian, which is generally composed of kinetic (-ħ2∇2/2me) and potential energy terms (φe). Atomic orbital, a mathematical function describing the wave-like behavior of either an electron or a pair of electrons in an atom, can be found from the Schrödinger equation with this electron Hamiltonian. Hydrogen-like atoms (a nucleus and an electron) allow for closed-form solution to Schrödinger equation with the electrostatic potential (the Coulomb law). The Schrödinger equation of atoms or atomic ions with more than one electron has not been solved analytically, because of the Coulomb interactions among electrons. Thus, numerical techniques are used, and an electron configuration is approximated as product of simpler hydrogen-like atomic orbitals (isolate electron orbitals). Molecules with multiple atoms (nuclei and their electrons) have molecular orbital (MO, a mathematical function for the wave-like behavior of an electron in a molecule), and are obtained from simplified solution techniques such as linear combination of atomic orbitals (LCAO). The molecular orbital is used to predict chemical and physical properties, and the difference between highest occupied molecular orbital (HOMO) and the lowest unoccupied molecular orbital (LUMO) is a measure of excitability of the molecules.

In a crystal structure of metallic solids, the free electron model (zero potential, φe = 0) for the behavior of valence electrons is used. However, in a periodic lattice (crystal), there is periodic crystal potential, so the electron Hamiltonian becomes

where me is the electron mass, and the periodic potential is expressed as φc (x) = Σg φgexp[i(g∙x)] (g: reciprocal lattice vector).  The time-independent Schrödinger equation with this Hamiltonian is given as (the eigenvalue equation)

where the eigenfunction ψe,κ is the electron wave function, and eigenvalue Ee(κe), is the electron energy (κe: electron wavevector).  The relation between wavevector, κe and energy Ee provides the electronic band structure.  In practice, a lattice as many-body systems includes interactions between electrons and nuclei in potential, but this calculation can be too intricate. Thus, many approximate techniques have been suggested and one of them is density functional theory (DFT), uses functionals of the spatially dependent electron density instead of full interactions. DFT is widely used in ab initio software (ABINIT, CASTEP, Quantum ESPRESSO, SIESTA, VASP, WIEN2k, etc.). The electron specific heat is based on the energy states and occupancy distribution (the Fermi–Dirac statistics).  In general, the heat capacity of electron is small except at very high temperature when they are in thermal equilibrium with phonons (lattice). Electrons contribute to heat conduction (in addition to charge carrying) in solid, especially in metals. Thermal conductivity tensor in solid is the sum of electric and phonon thermal conductivity tensors K = Ke + Kp.

Electrons are affected by two thermodynamic forces [from the charge, ∇(EF/ec) where EF is the Fermi level and ec is the electron charge and temperature gradient, ∇(1/T)] because they carry both charge and thermal energy, and thus electric current je and heat flow q are described with the thermoelectric tensors (Aee, Aet, Ate, and Att) from the Onsager reciprocal relations as

Converting these equations to have je equation in terms of electric field ee and ∇T and q equation with je and ∇T, (using scalar coefficients for isotropic transport, αee, αet, αte, and αtt instead of Aee, Aet, Ate, and Att)

Electrical conductivity/resistivity σe (Ω−1m−1)/ ρe (Ω-m), electric thermal conductivity ke (W/m-K) and the Seebeck/Peltier coefficients αS (V/K)/αP (V) are defined as,

Various carriers (electrons, magnons, phonons, and polarons) and their interactions substantially affect the Seebeck coefficient.  The Seebeck coefficient can be decomposed with two contributions, αS = αS,pres + αS,trans, where αS,pres is the sum of contributions to the carrier-induced entropy change, i.e., αS,pres = αS,mix + αS,spin + αS,vib (αS,mix: entropy-of-mixing, αS,spin: spin entropy, and αS,vib: vibrational entropy). The other contribution αS,trans is the net energy transferred in moving a carrier divided by qT (q: carrier charge). The electron's contributions to the Seebeck coefficient are mostly in αS,pres. The αS,mix is usually dominant in lightly doped semiconductors. The change of the entropy-of-mixing upon adding an electron to a system is the so-called Heikes formula

where feo = N/Na is the ratio of electrons to sites (carrier concentration). Using the chemical potential (μ), the thermal energy (kBT) and the Fermi function, above equation can be expressed in an alternative form, αS,mix = (kB/q)[(Ee − μ)/(kBT)].
Extending the Seebeck effect to spins, a ferromagnetic alloy can be a good example. The contribution to the Seebeck coefficient that results from electrons' presence altering the systems spin entropy is given by αS,spin = ΔSspin/q = (kB/q)ln[(2s + 1)/(2s0 +1)], where s0 and s are net spins of the magnetic site in the absence and presence of the carrier, respectively. Many vibrational effects with electrons also contribute to the Seebeck coefficient. The softening of the vibrational frequencies produces a change of the vibrational entropy is one of examples. The vibrational entropy is the negative derivative of the free energy, i.e.,

where Dp(ω) is the phonon density-of-states for the structure. For the high-temperature limit and series expansions of the hyperbolic functions, the above is simplified as αS,vib = (ΔSvib/q) = (kB/q)Σi(-Δωi/ωi).

The Seebeck coefficient derived in the above Onsager formulation is the mixing component αS,mix, which dominates in most semiconductors. The vibrational component in high-band gap materials such as B13C2 is very important.
Considering the microscopic transport (transport is a results of nonequilibrium),

where ue is the electron velocity vector, fe (feo) is the electron nonequilibrium (equilibrium) distribution, τe is the electron scattering time, Ee is the electron energy, and Fte is the electric and thermal forces from ∇(EF/ec) and ∇(1/T).
Relating the thermoelectric coefficients to the microscopic transport equations for je and q, the thermal, electric, and thermoelectric properties are calculated. Thus, ke increases with the electrical conductivity σe and temperature T, as the Wiedemann–Franz law presents [ke/(σeTe) = (1/3)(πkB/ec)2 = ].  Electron transport (represented as σe) is a function of carrier density ne,c and electron mobility μe (σe = ecne,cμe).  μe is determined by electron scattering rates  (or relaxation time) in various interaction mechanisms including interaction with other electrons, phonons, impurities and boundaries.

Electrons interact with other principal energy carriers. Electrons accelerated by an electric field are relaxed through the energy conversion to phonon (in semiconductors, mostly optical phonon), which is called Joule heating. Energy conversion between electric potential and phonon energy is considered in thermoelectrics such as Peltier cooling and thermoelectric generator.  Also, study of interaction with photons is central in optoelectronic applications (i.e. light-emitting diode, solar photovoltaic cells, etc.). Interaction rates or energy conversion rates can be evaluated using the Fermi golden rule (from the perturbation theory) with ab initio approach.

Fluid particle 

Fluid particle is the smallest unit (atoms or molecules) in the fluid phase (gas, liquid or plasma) without breaking any chemical bond. Energy of fluid particle is divided into potential, electronic, translational, vibrational, and rotational energies. The heat (thermal) energy storage in fluid particle is through the temperature-dependent particle motion (translational, vibrational, and rotational energies). The electronic energy is included only if temperature is high enough to ionize or dissociate the fluid particles or to include other electronic transitions. These quantum energy states of the fluid particles are found using their respective quantum Hamiltonian. These are Hf,t = −(ħ2/2m)∇2, Hf,v = −(ħ2/2m)∇2 + Γx2/2 and Hf,r = −(ħ2/2If)∇2 for translational, vibrational and rotational modes. (Γ: spring constant, If: the moment of inertia for the molecule). From the Hamiltonian, the quantized fluid particle energy state Ef and partition functions Zf [with the Maxwell–Boltzmann (MB) occupancy distribution] are found as

 translational 
 vibrational 
 rotational 
 total 

Here, gf is the degeneracy, n, l, and j are the transitional, vibrational and rotational quantum numbers, Tf,v is the characteristic temperature for vibration (= ħωf,v/kB, : vibration frequency), and Tf,r is the rotational temperature [= ħ2/(2IfkB)]. The average specific internal energy is related to the partition function through Zf, 

With the energy states and the partition function, the fluid particle specific heat capacity cv,f is the summation of contribution from various kinetic energies (for non-ideal gas the potential energy is also added). Because the total degrees of freedom in molecules is determined by the atomic configuration, cv,f has different formulas depending on the configuration,

 monatomic ideal gas 
 diatomic ideal gas 
 nonlinear, polyatomic ideal gas 

where Rg is the gas constant (= NAkB, NA: the Avogadro constant) and M is the molecular mass (kg/kmol). (For the polyatomic ideal gas, No is the number of atoms in a molecule.) In gas, constant-pressure specific heat capacity cp,f has a larger value and the difference depends on the temperature T, volumetric thermal expansion coefficient β and the isothermal compressibility κ [cp,f – cv,f = Tβ2/(ρfκ), ρf : the fluid density].  For dense fluids that the interactions between the particles (the van der Waals interaction) should be included, and cv,f and cp,f would change accordingly.
The net motion of particles (under gravity or external pressure) gives rise to the convection heat flux qu = ρfcp,fufT. Conduction heat flux qk for ideal gas is derived with the gas kinetic theory or the Boltzmann transport equations, and the thermal conductivity is

where ⟨uf2⟩1/2 is the RMS (root mean square) thermal velocity (3kBT/m from the MB distribution function, m: atomic mass) and τf-f is the relaxation time (or intercollision time period) [(21/2π d2nf ⟨uf⟩)−1 from the gas kinetic theory, ⟨uf⟩: average thermal speed (8kBT/πm)1/2, d: the collision diameter of fluid particle (atom or molecule), nf: fluid number density].

kf is also calculated using molecular dynamics (MD), which simulates physical movements of the fluid particles with the Newton equations of motion (classical) and force field (from ab initio or empirical properties). For calculation of kf, the equilibrium MD with Green–Kubo relations, which express the transport coefficients in terms of integrals of time correlation functions (considering fluctuation), or nonequilibrium MD (prescribing heat flux or temperature difference in simulated system) are generally employed.

Fluid particles can interact with other principal particles. Vibrational or rotational modes, which have relatively high energy, are excited or decay through the interaction with photons. Gas lasers employ the interaction kinetics between fluid particles and photons, and laser cooling has been also considered in CO2 gas laser. Also, fluid particles can be adsorbed on solid surfaces (physisorption and chemisorption), and the frustrated vibrational modes in adsorbates (fluid particles) is decayed by creating e−-h+ pairs or phonons.  These interaction rates are also calculated through ab initio calculation on fluid particle and the Fermi golden rule.

Photon 

Photon is the quanta of electromagnetic (EM) radiation and energy carrier for radiation heat transfer. The EM wave is governed by the classical Maxwell equations, and the quantization of EM wave is used for phenomena such as the blackbody radiation (in particular to explain the ultraviolet catastrophe). The quanta EM wave (photon) energy of angular frequency ωph is Eph = ħωph, and follows the Bose–Einstein distribution function (fph). The photon Hamiltonian for the quantized radiation field (second quantization) is

where ee and be are the electric and magnetic fields of the EM radiation, εo and μo are the free-space permittivity and permeability, V is the interaction volume, ωph,α is the photon angular frequency for the α mode and cα† and cα are the photon creation and annihilation operators. The vector potential ae of EM fields (ee = −∂ae/∂t and be = ∇×ae) is

where sph,α is the unit polarization vector, κα is the wave vector.

Blackbody radiation among various types of photon emission employs the photon gas model with thermalized energy distribution without interphoton interaction. From the linear dispersion relation (i.e., dispersionless), phase and group speeds are equal (uph = d ωph/dκ = ωph/κ, uph: photon speed) and the Debye (used for dispersionless photon) density of states is Dph,b,ωdω = ωph2dωph/π2uph3. With Dph,b,ω and equilibrium distribution fph, photon energy spectral distribution dIb,ω or dIb,λ (λph: wavelength) and total emissive power Eb are derived as
 (Planck law),
 (Stefan–Boltzmann law).

Compared to blackbody radiation, laser emission has high directionality (small solid angle ΔΩ) and spectral purity (narrow bands Δω). Lasers range far-infrared to X-rays/γ-rays regimes based on the resonant transition (stimulated emission) between electronic energy states.

Near-field radiation from thermally excited dipoles and other electric/magnetic transitions is very effective within a short distance (order of wavelength) from emission sites.

The BTE for photon particle momentum pph = ħωphs/uph along direction s experiencing absorption/emission  (= uphσph,ω[fph(ωph,T) - fph(s)], σph,ω: spectral absorption coefficient), and generation/removal , is

In terms of radiation intensity (Iph,ω = uphfphħωphDph,ω/4π, Dph,ω: photon density of states), this is called the equation of radiative transfer (ERT)
The net radiative heat flux vector is 

From the Einstein population rate equation, spectral absorption coefficient σph,ω in ERT is,

where  is the interaction probability (absorption) rate or the Einstein coefficient B12 (J−1 m3 s−1), which gives the probability per unit time per unit spectral energy density of the radiation field (1: ground state, 2: excited state), and ne is electron density (in ground state). This can be obtained using the transition dipole moment μe with the FGR and relationship between Einstein coefficients. Averaging σph,ω over ω gives the average photon absorption coefficient σph.

For the case of optically thick medium of length L, i.e., σphL >> 1, and using the gas kinetic theory, the photon conductivity kph is 16σSBT3/3σph (σSB: Stefan–Boltzmann constant, σph: average photon absorption), and photon heat capacity nphcv,ph is 16σSBT3/uph.

Photons have the largest range of energy and central in a variety of energy conversions. Photons interact with electric and magnetic entities. For example, electric dipole which in turn are excited by optical phonons or fluid particle vibration, or transition dipole moments of electronic transitions. In heat transfer physics, the interaction kinetics of phonon is treated using the perturbation theory (the Fermi golden rule) and the interaction Hamiltonian. The photon-electron interaction is

where pe is the dipole moment vector and a† and a are the creation and annihilation of internal motion of electron.  Photons also participate in ternary interactions, e.g., phonon-assisted photon absorption/emission (transition of electron energy level). The vibrational mode in fluid particles can decay or become excited by emitting or absorbing photons. Examples are solid and molecular gas laser cooling.

Using ab initio calculations based on the first principles along with EM theory, various radiative properties such as dielectric function (electrical permittivity, εe,ω), spectral absorption coefficient (σph,ω), and the complex refraction index (mω), are calculated for various interactions between photons and electric/magnetic entities in matter. For example, the imaginary part (εe,c,ω) of complex dielectric function (εe,ω = εe,r,ω + i εe,c,ω) for electronic transition across a bandgap is 

where V is the unit-cell volume, VB and CB denote the valence and conduction bands, wκ is the weight associated with a κ-point, and pij is the transition momentum matrix element.
The real part is εe,r,ω is obtained from εe,c,ω using the Kramers-Kronig relation

Here,  denotes the principal value of the integral.

In another example, for the far IR regions where the optical phonons are involved, the dielectric function (εe,ω) are calculated as

where LO and TO denote the longitudinal and transverse optical phonon modes, j is all the IR-active modes, and γ is the temperature-dependent damping term in the oscillator model. εe,∞ is high frequency dielectric permittivity, which can be calculated DFT calculation when ions are treated as external potential.

From these dielectric function (εe,ω) calculations (e.g., Abinit, VASP, etc.), the complex refractive index mω(= nω + i κω, nω: refraction index and κω: extinction index) is found, i.e., mω2 = εe,ω = εe,r,ω + i εe,c,ω). The surface reflectance R of an ideal surface with normal incident from vacuum or air is given as R = [(nω - 1)2 + κω2]/[(nω + 1)2 + κω2]. The spectral absorption coefficient is then found from σph,ω = 2ω κω/uph. The spectral absorption coefficient for various electric entities are listed in the below table.

See also 
Energy transfer
Mass transfer
Energy transformation (Energy conversion)
Thermal physics
Thermal science
Thermal engineering

References 

Heat transfer
Thermodynamics
Condensed matter physics